4-HO-McPeT (4-hydroxy-N-methyl-N-cyclopentyltryptamine) is a tryptamine derivative which has serotonergic effects.

See also
 4-HO-DSBT
 4-HO-McPT
 4-HO-MPMI
 4-HO-pyr-T
 4-HO-DMT (Psilocin)
 PiPT

References

Phenols
Tryptamines